The 2004–05 NBA season was the Warriors' 59th season in the National Basketball Association, and 43rd season in the San Francisco Bay Area. During the offseason, the Warriors signed free agent Derek Fisher. Under new head coach Mike Montgomery, the Warriors stumbled out of the gate losing their first six games on their way to an awful 3–12 start. Their struggles continued posting a nine-game losing streak in January, losing 14 of their 15 games during the month. At midseason, the team traded Speedy Claxton to the New Orleans Hornets for All-Star guard Baron Davis, and dealt Clifford Robinson to the New Jersey Nets. The deal to acquire Davis would have an immediate impact as suddenly the Warriors became competitive, winning eight straight games between March and April, finishing tied in last place in the Pacific Division with a 34–48 record. Jason Richardson led the team in scoring with 21.7 points per game.

For this season, they added new orange road alternate road uniforms with dark navy blue side panels to their jerseys and shorts, they remained in used until 2010.

Draft

Roster

Regular season

Season standings

Record vs. opponents

Transactions

Trades

Free agency

Re-signed

Additions

Subtractions

References

Golden State Warriors seasons
Golden State Warriors
Golden State Warriors
Golden State Warriors